KBGU-LD, virtual channel 33 (UHF digital channel 27), is a low powered Buzzr-affiliated television station licensed to St. Louis, Missouri, United States. The station is owned by Innovate Corp.

History 
Although granted a construction permit in July 1987, the station did not commence broadcasting until 1991. The station was originally K18BT, an owned-and-operated translator of the Trinity Broadcasting Network, with all programming retransmitted via a satellite feed from TBN's headquarters in Santa Ana, California. The station's call letters were changed to K33GU upon moving to analog UHF channel 33.

In 2010, TBN closed down many of its low-powered repeaters, including K33GU, due to ongoing economic problems. Many of these repeaters would be donated by TBN to the Minority Media and Television Council (MMTC), an organization designed to preserve equal opportunity and civil rights in the media.
In 2015, the station was purchased by DTV America Corporation, but the license was held under the company King Forward, Inc., a unit of DTV America, with Regal Media announced as the operator of the station. King Forward changed the call letters to KBGU-LP, and converted the station to digital. The station returned to the air on May 25 of that year as an affiliate of MundoMax, with Estrella TV being offered on a second digital subchannel, and Video Mix TV, a music channel originating from southern Florida, on a third subchannel. 7 months later, in December 2015, MundoMax was replaced with Buzzr.

King Forward sold its stations, including KBGU-LP, to Innovate Corp in 2017.

The station changed its call sign to KBGU-LD on March 4, 2020.

Digital channels
The station's digital signal is multiplexed:

References

External links

Television stations in St. Louis
Buzzr affiliates
Laff (TV network) affiliates
Trinity Broadcasting Network affiliates
Television channels and stations established in 1991
Low-power television stations in the United States
Innovate Corp.
1991 establishments in Missouri